Catocala leechi is a moth of the family Erebidae first described by George Hampson in 1913. It is found in Kashmir.

References

External links
"Catocala leechi". The Witt Catalogue – A Taxonomic Atlas of the Eurasian and North African Noctuioidea. Museum Witt München. With image.

leechi
Moths described in 1913
Moths of Asia